The Wiener Volkskonservatorium was a Conservatory in Vienna established between 1923 and 1926 by Ferdinand Grossmann, Emmerich Maday, and Eduard Castle.

It was dissolved in 1938 amidst financial difficulties.

Among its faculty were Ferdinand Grossmann, who served as artistic director, Fritz Högler, who served as artistic director, Franz Burkhart, Armin Kaufmann, Viktor Korda, Walter Pach, and Walter Bricht.

References
 Music Education Establishments in Vienna
 History of the Wiener Volkskonservatorium
 Ferdinand Grossmann biography

Music schools in Austria
Education in Vienna
Music in Vienna
1923 establishments in Austria